Leonard D. Shapiro is an American computer scientist. He is a professor emeritus at Portland State University.

Education 
Shapiro graduated from Reed College in 1965, Phi Beta Kappa. He earned a doctor of philosophy from Yale University in 1969.

Career 
Shapiro was an assistant professor of mathematics at University of Minnesota from 1969 to 1976 and was a visiting professor of economics from 1976 to 1977. He was the chairman of the division of mathematical sciences at North Dakota State University from 1977 to 1985. Shapiro was a visiting scholar at the computer science department at University of California, Berkeley in 1983. He was an associate and later full professor of computer science and business economics at North Dakota State University from 1977 to 1987. Shapiro was the chair of the computer science department at Portland State University from 1987 to 1994. He continues as a professor emeritus. Since 1994, Shapiro has served as the associate director and director of the Data Intensive Systems Center (DISC).

Personal life 
Shapiro is married to Elayne née Halpern. They have three sons, Daniel, Joseph and Ari Shapiro. He is the vice president of Congregation Neveh Shalom.

References

External links 
 

Year of birth missing (living people)
Living people
20th-century American scientists
21st-century American scientists
American computer scientists
Jewish American scientists
North Dakota State University faculty
Portland State University faculty
Reed College alumni
University of Minnesota faculty
Yale University alumni
21st-century American Jews